Chahal is a municipality in the Guatemalan department of Alta Verapaz. The name originates from the Mayans.

History

Spanish conquest and the Dominican friars

On his second visit to Guatemala, in 1537, friar Bartolome de las Casas, O.P. wanted to employ his new method of conversion based on two principles: 1) to preach the Gospel to all men and treat them as equals, and 2) to assert that conversion must be voluntary and based on knowledge and understanding of the Faith. It was important for Las Casas that this method be tested without meddling from secular colonists, so he chose a territory in the heart of Guatemala where there were no previous colonies and where the natives were considered fierce and war-like. Because it had not been possible to conquer the land by military means, the governor of Guatemala, Alonso de Maldonado, agreed to sign a contract promising that if the venture was successful he would not establish any new encomiendas in the area. Las Casas's group of friars established a Dominican presence in Rabinal, Sacapulas and Cobán, reaching as far as Chahal. Through the efforts of Las Casas' missionaries the so-called "Land of War" came to be called "Verapaz", "True Peace". Las Casas's strategy was to teach Christian songs to merchant Indian Christians who then ventured into the area. In this way he was successful in converting several native chiefs, among them those of Atitlán and Chichicastenango, and in building several churches in the territory named Alta Verapaz. These congregated a group of Christian Indians in the location of what is now the town of Rabinal. In 1538 Las Casas was recalled from his mission by Bishop Francisco Marroquin who wanted him to go to Mexico and then on to Spain in order to seek more Dominicans to assist in the mission.

Franja Transversal del Norte 

The first settler project in the Franja Transversal del Norte (FTN) was in Sebol-Chinajá in Alta Verapaz. Sebol, then regarded as a strategic point and route through Cancuén river, which communicated with Petén through the Usumacinta River on the border with Mexico and the only road that existed was a dirt one built by President Lázaro Chacón in 1928.  In 1958, during the government of General Miguel Ydígoras Fuentes the Inter-American Development Bank (IDB) financed infrastructure projects in Sebol.   In 1960, then Army captain Fernando Romeo Lucas Garcia inherited Saquixquib and Punta de Boloncó farms in northeastern Sebol.  In 1963 he bought the farm "San Fernando" El Palmar de Sejux and finally bought the "Sepur" farm near San Fernando.  During those years, Lucas was in the Guatemalan legislature and lobbied in Congress to boost investment in that area of the country.

In 1962, the DGAA became the National Institute of Agrarian Reform (INTA), by Decree 1551 which created the law of Agrarian Transformation.  In 1964, INTA defined the geography of the FTN as the northern part of the departments of Huehuetenango, Quiché , Alta Verapaz and Izabal and that same year priests of the Maryknoll order and the Order of the Sacred Heart began the first process of colonization, along with INTA, carrying settlers from Huehuetenango to the Ixcán sector in Quiché.

The Northern Transversal Strip was officially created during the government of General Carlos Arana Osorio in 1970, by Decree 60-70 in the Congress, for agricultural development.

African oil palm 

There is a large demand within Guatemala and some of its neighbors for edible oils and fats, which would explain how the African oil palm became so prevalent in the country in detriment of other oils, and which has allowed new companies associated to large capitals in a new investment phase that can be found particularly in some territories that form the Northern Transversal Strip of Guatemala. The investors are trying to turn Guatemala into one of the main palm oil exporters, in spite of the decline on its international price.  The most active region is found in Chisec and Cobán, in Alta Verapaz Department; Ixcán in Quiché Department, and Sayaxché, Petén Department, where Palmas del Ixcán, S.A. (PALIX) is located, both with its own plantation and those of subcontractors. Another active region is that of Fray Bartolomé de las Casas and Chahal in Alta Verapaz Department; El Estor and Livingston, Izabal Department; and San Luis, Petén, where Naturaceites operates.

Climate

Chahal has a tropical climate (Köppen: Af).

Geographic location

See also

 Alta Verapaz
 Cahabón
 Fernando Romeo Lucas García
 Franja Transversal del Norte
 Izabal
 Manuel Lisandro Barillas

Notes and references

References

Bibliography

 
 
 

Municipalities of the Alta Verapaz Department